Pakatan may refer to:
 The Pakatan Rakyat, an informal Malaysian political coalition that began in 2008 and was dissolved in 2015
 The Pakatan Harapan, the Malaysian political coalition that succeeded the Pakatan Rakyat
 Maleng language, also known as Pakatan Language, a language of Laos and Vietnam